The Journal of Religion is an academic journal published by the University of Chicago Press founded in 1897 as The American Journal of Theology.  The journal "embraces all areas of theology (biblical, historical, ethical, and constructive) as well as other types of religious studies (literary, social, psychological, and philosophical)."

See also
List of theological journals

References 

Publications established in 1882
Religious studies journals
University of Chicago Press academic journals
Quarterly journals